Hassan Saaid (born 4 March 1992) is a Maldivian athlete specialising in the sprinting events. He represented his country at the 2010 and 2014 Commonwealth Games, as well as the 2010 and 2014 Asian Games.

He is the current national record holder in the 100, 200 and 400 metres, as well as the 4×100 metres relay.

He studied at the University of West Indies in Jamaica.

Saaid won his country's first ever South Asian Games gold medal (in the 100m event) at the 2019 edition held in Kathmandu, Nepal.

Competition record

Personal bests
Outdoor
100 metres – 10.33 (+1.9 m/s) (Kingston 2016) NR
200 metres – 20.75 (+1.0 m/s) (Bangalore 2016) NR
400 metres – 47.48 (Kingston 2013) NR

Indoor
60 metres – 6.75 (Doha 2016) NR

References

External links
 
 
 

1992 births
Living people
Maldivian male sprinters
Olympic athletes of the Maldives
Athletes (track and field) at the 2016 Summer Olympics
Athletes (track and field) at the 2020 Summer Olympics
Olympic male sprinters
Asian Games competitors for the Maldives
Athletes (track and field) at the 2010 Asian Games
Athletes (track and field) at the 2014 Asian Games
Athletes (track and field) at the 2018 Asian Games
Commonwealth Games competitors for the Maldives
Athletes (track and field) at the 2010 Commonwealth Games
Athletes (track and field) at the 2014 Commonwealth Games
World Athletics Championships athletes for the Maldives
South Asian Games gold medalists in athletics
South Asian Games medalists in athletics
South Asian Games gold medalists for Maldives
South Asian Games silver medalists for Maldives
South Asian Games bronze medalists for Maldives
Athletes (track and field) at the 2022 Commonwealth Games